David of Sasun is a Yerevan Metro station. It is one of the original metro stations in the city of Yerevan and was opened to the public on 7 March 1981. It is connected to the adjacent Yerevan railway station by a pedestrian tunnel.

It is named for David of Sassoun, a statue of whom stands outside the railway station.

Gallery

References

Yerevan Metro stations
Railway stations opened in 1981
1981 establishments in Armenia